The 2013 Korea National League was the eleventh season of the Korea National League. A total of ten clubs participated in this season after four clubs were dropped out from the league. Ansan H FC (Goyang Hi FC), Suwon City (Suwon FC), and Chungju Hummel started to participate in a new professional league K League 2. Kookmin Bank decided to dissolve their football club Goyang KB Kookmin Bank and sponsor K League 2 club FC Anyang. The post-season playoffs were contested by four teams.

Teams

Regular season

League table

Positions by matchday

Results

Matches 1–18

Matches 19–27

Championship playoffs

See also
 2013 in South Korean football
 2013 Korea National League Championship
 2013 Korean FA Cup

References

External links
 Official website

Korea National League seasons